The 25th Virginia Cavalry Regiment was a cavalry regiment raised in Virginia for service in the Confederate States Army during the American Civil War. It fought mostly in western Virginia and the Shenandoah Valley.

Virginia's 25th Cavalry Regiment was organized in July, 1864, using the 27th Battalion Virginia Partisan Rangers as its nucleus. Serving in McCausland's and Imboden's Brigade, the unit fought in numerous engagements in western Virginia and the Shenandoah Valley. During April, 1865, it disbanded. Its commanders were Colonel Warren M. Hopkins, Lieutenant Colonel Henry A. Edmundson, and Major Sylvester R. McConnell.

See also

List of Virginia Civil War units

References

Units and formations of the Confederate States Army from Virginia
1864 establishments in Virginia
Military units and formations established in 1864
1865 disestablishments in Virginia
Military units and formations disestablished in 1865